The Phycitini are a tribe of moths of the family Pyralidae.

Genera
Some significant species are also listed.

 Abareia Whalley, 1970
 Acrobasis Zeller, 1839
 Addyme Walker, 1863
 Alberada Heinrich, 1939 (sometimes listed as a synonym of Zophodia)
 Alophia Ragonot, 1893
 Ammatucha Turner, 1922
 Amphithrix Ragonot, 1893
 Ancylodes Ragonot, 1887
 Ancylosis Zeller, 1839
 Ancylosoma Roesler, 1973
 Ancylostomia Ragonot, 1893
 Anonaepestis Ragonot, 1894
 Apomyelois Heinrich, 1956
 Archiephestia Amsel, 1955
 Arcola J. C. Shaffer, 1995 – alligatorweed stem borer
 Arsissa Ragonot, 1893
 Asalebria Amsel, 1953
 Asarta Zeller, 1848
 Asartodes Ragonot, 1893
 Asclerobia Roesler, 1969
 Assara Walker, 1863
 Aurana Walker, 1863
 Bahiria Balinsky, 1994
 Barbifrontia Hampson in Ragonot, 1901
 Bazaria Ragonot, 1887
 Bradyrrhoa Zeller, 1848
 Cactoblastis Ragonot, 1901
 Cactobrosis Dyar, 1914 (sometimes listed as a synonym of Zophodia)
 Cadra Walker, 1864
 Calguia Walker, 1863
 Catastia Hübner, 1825
 Cathyalia Ragonot, 1888
 Cavipalpia Ragonot, 1893
 Ceutholopha Zeller, 1867
 Christophia Ragonot, 1887
 Copamyntis Meyrick, 1934
 Cremnophila Ragonot, 1893
 Creobota Turner, 1931
 Crocydopora Meyrick, 1882
 Cryptarthria Roesler, 1981
 Cryptomyelois Roesler & Küppers, 1979
 Ctenomedes Meyrick, 1935
 Ctenomeristis Meyrick, 1929
 Dectocera Ragonot, 1887
 Delplanqueia Leraut, 2001
 Denticera Amsel, 1961
 Dioryctria Zeller, 1846
 Dipha Yoshiyasu, 1988
 Ecbletodes Turner, 1904
 Echinocereta Neunzig, 1997
 Ecnomoneura Turner, 1942
 Ectohomoeosoma Roesler, 1965
 Ectomyelois Heinrich, 1956 (sometimes in Apomyelois)
 Ectomyelois ceratoniae – locust bean moth
 Elegia Ragonot, 1887
 Encryphodes Turner, 1913
 Ephestia Guenée, 1845
 Ephestiopsis Ragonot, 1893 
 Ephestiopsis oenobarella
 Epicrocis Zeller, 1848 
 Epischidia Rebel, 1901 
 Epischnia Hübner, 1825
 Episcythrastis Meyrick, 1937
 Eremberga Heinrich, 1939 (sometimes listed as a synonym of Zophodia)
 Eremographa Meyrick, 1932
Etiella Zeller, 1839 
 Etiella behrii
 Etiella zinckenella
 Eucampyla Meyrick, 1882
 Eucarphia Hübner, 1825 
 Eurhodope Hübner, 1825
 Eurhodope rosella
 Euzophera Zeller, 1867
 Euzopherodes Hampson, 1899
 Exguiana Neunzig & Solis, 2004
 Faveria Walker, 1859 
 Faveria tritalis
 Glyptoteles Zeller, 1848
 Gymnancyla Zeller, 1848
 Hansreisseria Roesler, 1973
 Heterochrosis Hampson, 1926
 Homoeosoma J. Curtis, 1833
 Hypargyria Ragonot, 1888
 Hypochalcia Hübner, 1825 
 Hypochalcia lignella
 Hyporatasa Rebel, 1901 
 Hypsipyla Ragonot, 1888
 Hypsipyla grandella
 Indomalayia Roesler & Küppers, 1979
 Indomyrlaea Roesler & Küppers, 1979
 Keradere Whalley, 1970 
 Khorassania Amsel, 1951 
 Khorassania compositella
 Klimeschiola Roesler, 1965
 Laetilia Ragonot, 1889
 Laodamia Ragonot, 1888
 Lasiosticha Meyrick, 1887 
 Lasiosticha canilinea
 Lasiosticha opimella
 Lophothoracia Hampson, 1901
 Lymphia Rebel, 1901 
 Magiria Zeller, 1867
 Medaniaria Roesler & Küppers, 1979
 Megasis Guenée, 1845
 Melitara Walker, 1863 (sometimes listed as a synonym of Zophodia)
 Merulempista Roesler, 1967
 Mesciniadia Hampson in Ragonot, 1901
 Metallosticha Rebel, 1901
 Metallostichodes Roesler, 1967
 Meyrickiella Hampson in Ragonot, 1901
 Michaeliodes Roesler, 1969
 Moitrelia Leraut, 2001
 Myelois Hübner, 1825
 Myelopsis Heinrich, 1956
 Myrlaea Ragonot, 1887
 Nephopterix Hübner, 1825
 Nephopterix angustella
 Niethammeriodes Roesler, 1969
 Nonambesa Roesler & Küppers, 1979
 Nyctegretis Zeller, 1848
 Nyctegretis lineana
 Olycella Walker, 1863(sometimes listed as a synonym of Zophodia)
 Oncocera Stephens, 1829
 Oncocera semirubella
 Ortholepis Ragonot, 1887
 Ortholepis betulae
 Oxydisia Hampson, 1901
 Ozamia Hampson in Ragonot, 1901(sometimes listed as a synonym of Zophodia)
 Paramaxillaria Inoue, 1955
 Parramatta Hampson in Ragonot, 1901
 Patagonia Hampson in Ragonot, 1901
 Patagoniodes Roesler, 1969
 Pempelia Hübner, 1825
 Pempelia brephiella
 Pempelia formosa
 Pempelia genistella – gorse colonial hard shoot moth
 Pempelia heringii – pear fruit borer
 Pempelia palumbella
 Pempeliella Caradja, 1916
 Phycita J.Curtis, 1828
 Phycitodes Hampson, 1917
 Phycitodes reliquella
 Pima Hulst, 1888
 Plodia Guenée, 1845– Indianmeal moth
 Polopeustis Ragonot, 1893
 Praeepischnia Amsel, 1954
 Protoetiella Inoue, 1959
 Pseudacrobasis Roesler, 1975
 Pseudoceroprepes Roesler, 1982
 Pseudophycita Roesler, 1969
 Psorosa Zeller, 1846
 Pterothrixidia Amsel, 1954
 Ptyobathra Turner, 1905
 Ptyomaxia Hampson, 1903
 Pyla Grote, 1882
 Pyla fusca (sometimes separated in Matilella)
 Rambutaneia Roesler & Küppers, 1979
 Ratasa Herrich-Schäffer, 1849
 Salebriopsis Hannemann, 1965
 Sciota Hulst, 1888
 Sciota adelphella
 Sciota rhenella
 Sciota subcaesiella
 Seeboldia Ragonot, 1887
 Selagia Hübner, 1825
 Sempronia Ragonot, 1888
 Stanempista Roesler, 1969
 Stereobela Turner, 1905
 Sudaniola Roesler, 1973
 Symphonistis Turner, 1904
 Synoria Ragonot, 1888
 Syntypica Turner, 1905
 Tephris Ragonot, 1891
 Thospia Ragonot, 1888
 Thylacoptila Meyrick, 1885
 Trachonitis Zeller, 1848
 Trissonca Meyrick, 1882
 Trychnocrana Turner, 1925
 Tucumania (sometimes listed as a synonym of Zophodia)
 Tylochares Meyrick, 1883
 Unadillides Hampson, 1930
 Unadophanes M. Shaffer, Nielsen & Horak, 1996
 Vietteia Amsel, 1955
 Vinicia Ragonot, 1893
 Vitula Ragonot, 1887
 Volobilis Walker, 1863
 Yosemitia (sometimes listed as a synonym of Zophodia)
 Zonula J.C.Shaffer, 1995 (formerly Hyalospila Ragonot, 1888 nec Herrich-Schäffer, 1853: preoccupied)
 Zophodia Hübner, 1825
 Zophodia grossulariella

References

 
Moth tribes